Linda Wagenmakers (born 30 November 1975, Arnhem) is a Dutch singer and voice actress. She started her career at 21 playing Kim in the Dutch version of the musical Miss Saigon. She played in the RTL 4 drama series Westenwind, for which she also recorded the song "Laat me vrij om te gaan". Wagenmakers voiced the Dutch version of Mulan in the Disney animation movie. And was part of many television shows and events. She was part of the original cast of Rocky over the rainbow playing Maggs and in later versions Dorothy. She was part of Musicals in Ahoy in 2001 singing the role of Kim from Miss Saigon as well as Eponine from Les Miserables.
She also represented her country in the Eurovision Song Contest 2000 in Stockholm, with the song "No Goodbyes" involving a huge black and white dress designed by Jan Aarntzen She featured in a gospel national theater tour in The Spirit of Joy! 
She also played the lead role in the Dolly Dots musical Love me just a little bit more as Lisa, an awkward high school girl with a great voice caught in teenage drama. She released a Gospel Album called Full Circle played Sis in the musical Shhh...it happens She played Alex in The Witches of Eastwick working alongside of April Darby and Joke de Kruijf. She played the witch Caramella at the national tour of Hansel and Gretl for Van Hoorne productions and as the Lady of the Lake in the Monty Python musical Spamalot. She returned to the stage as Anastasia in the comedy Fifty shades, the parody for Senf productions. She also was the voice of Tiana, the first African-American Disney Princess for the animated movie Princess and the Frog Alongside her work on stage she started to devote time on coaching other artists vocally and mentally for Vocal Center, and finished the competition in 13th place after the voting. Wagenmakers played the role of Kim in the Dutch version of the musical Miss Saigon. She also sang in the show Musicals in Ahoy.

Dubbing
Mulan - Mulan
The Princess and the Frog - Tiana
Winx Club: The Mystery of the Abyss - Icy and singer for "Sirenix"
Tashi - Lotus
Ralph Breaks the Internet - Mulan and Tiana

Discography

Albums
Miss Saigon Original Dutch Cast recording (1997)
Love me just a little bit more, the musical  Cast recordingFull Circle Gospel Album
Spamalot

Singles

References

Miss Saigon

External links

1975 births
Living people
Dutch gospel singers
Eurovision Song Contest entrants for the Netherlands
Dutch women singers
Dutch musical theatre actresses
Dutch people of Indonesian descent
Dutch pop singers
Eurovision Song Contest entrants of 2000
People from Arnhem
United Pentecostal and Evangelical Churches members
Nationaal Songfestival contestants